The Pakistan cricket team toured England in the 1967 season to play a three-match Test series against England. England won the series 2-0 with 1 match drawn.

Test series summary

First Test

Second Test

External sources
 CricketArchive – tour summaries

Annual reviews
 Playfair Cricket Annual 1968
 Wisden Cricketers' Almanack 1968

Further reading
 Bill Frindall, The Wisden Book of Test Cricket 1877-1978, Wisden, 1979
 

1967 in Pakistani cricket
1967 in English cricket
1967
International cricket competitions from 1960–61 to 1970